The Picola United Football Netball Club, nicknamed the Blues, is an Australian rules football and netball club playing in the Picola & District Football League.  The club is based in the small Victorian town of Picola.

The club was founded as a merger between Picola Football Club and Yalca North Football Club.

Premierships

Picola Football Club

Yalca North Football Club

Picola United Football Club

References

External links
 
 Gameday site

Picola & District Football League clubs
Australian rules football clubs in Victoria (Australia)
1971 establishments in Australia